Aman Verma (born 11 October 1971) is an Indian television anchor and actor. As an anchor, Verma is best known for hosting the game show Khullja Sim Sim on Star Plus from 2001 to 2004. His other hosting duties were with Mini Mathur in the first season of Indian Idol on Sony TV and Zee TV's Zee Cinestars. He has also acted in Bollywood movies. Verma was also seen in Life OK's show Hum Ne Li Hai- Shapath as ACP Diler Kumar. He also participated in the ninth season of Indian reality series Bigg Boss.

Career

Verma made his acting debut in the TV serial Pachpan Khambe Laal Deewarein with Mita Vashisht in 1993. He also played the character of Vrishaketu, son of Karna, in Mahabharat Katha. Then he started his film career with, Sangharsh (1999), portraying a supporting role. He portrayed the role of Anupam Kapadia for four years in Kyunki Saas Bhi Kabhi Bahu Thi. In 2002, Verma portrayed the lead role of SP Aditya Pratap Singh in Kehta Hai Dil, for which he won the Indian Telly Award for Best Actor in a Lead Role - Male in 2003.

In 2003, Verma starred in the film Pran Jaye Par Shaan Na Jaye as the solo lead opposite Rinke Khanna and in the film Koi Hai. In both films, he portrayed solo leads. Later that year, he portrayed a supporting role in Baghban (2003), which starred Amitabh Bachchan and Hema Malini in lead roles. Verma anchored the game show, Khullja Sim Sim on Star Plus from 2001 to 2004, until he was replaced by TV actor, Hussain Kuwajerwala, who was his co-star in Kyunki Saas Bhi Kabhi Bahu Thi. The two also starred together in another serial Kumkum  –  Ek Pyara Sa Bandhan, which aired on Star Plus.

Verma has made special appearances in films through his career as an anchor. He also portrayed a comedy role of Zubin in Jaan-E-Mann (2006). In that same year, Verma portrayed his first lead role in a TV serial on Viraasat, portraying a negative role.

He was in a TV serial Teen Bahuraniyaan playing the role of a man called Sumit Desai who was in a coma for the past few years whose children died but did not know it. He was also part of the first season of a reality show on Sony TV Iss Jungle Se Mujhe Bachao, which is inspired from the British reality show I'm a Celebrity...Get Me Out of Here! He played a lead role as Advocate Kunal Mehra in Sony TV's Bayttaab Dil Kee Tamanna Hai. In 2012, he acted in Ek Hazaaron Mein Meri Behna Hai. In 2015, he participated in Colors TV's Bigg Boss 9 as a contestant and got evicted after six weeks.

He is playing the character of an advocate in Director Shailendra Pandey's upcoming film JD.

Controversies 

Verma was the target of a casting couch sting operation which was aired on India TV in March 2005. He was seen begging Suhaib Ilyasi to remove his footage from the sting operation. Verma sued India TV CEO Rajat Sharma, programme manager Suhaib Ilyasi and journalist Ruchi, who was involved in the operation, alleging that the channel wanted to "blackmail and extort money" from him.

Filmography

Films

Television

Web series

Awards

References

External links

Indian male television actors
Living people
Entertainment scandals
Indian male soap opera actors
Bigg Boss (Hindi TV series) contestants
Indian game show hosts
Place of birth missing (living people)
1971 births